Dwarkanath Sanzgiri (born 15 November) is a script writer, anchor, journalist and author. He has written more than 25 books.

Early life
Sanzgiri was born in Mumbai and completed schooling from King George High School. He worked as chief engineer at Mumbai Municipal Corporation when he was in the service.

Career
He is a writer on cricket and other sports, social issues, films, humor, travel and tourism. He also writes in many newspapers including Loksatta, Saamna, Tarun Bharat, Aaj Dinank, Sanj Loksatta, Sakal, Pudhari, Mid Day. He also writes in magazines like Lokprabha, Deeplaxmi, Shree, Chitra lekha, and Ekach Shatkar.

Books in Marathi
 Afalatun Avaliye अफलातून अवलिये/दशावतार
 Batchit cricketpatunshi बातचीत क्रिकेटपटूंशी
 Bhatakegiri भटकेगिरी
 Bolandaji बोलंदाजी
 Champions चॅम्पियन्स  
 Chiranjeev Sachin चिरंजीव सचिन
 Chittavedhak Vishwachshak 2003 चित्तवेधक विश्वचषक २००३
 Cricket cocktail क्रिकेट कॉकटेल 
 Cricket World Cup highlights क्रिकेट वर्ल्ड कप हायलाईट्स 
 Dadar - Ek Pinacolada दादर - एक पिनाकोलाडा
 Dilkhulas batchit cricketpatunshi दिलखुलास बातचीत क्रिकेटपटूंशी
 Falnichya Deshaat फाळणीच्या देशात
 Filmgiri फिल्मगिरी
 Katha vishwachshkachya कथा विश्वचषकाच्या 
 Khullamkhilli खुल्लमखिल्ली
 London Olympics लंडन ऑलिंपिक
 Mazi Baherkhyali माझी बाहेरख्याली
 Mazi mulukhgiri माझी मुलुखगिरी
 Phalnichya deshat फाळणीच्या देशात
 Phirta Phirta फिरता – फिरता
 Power play पॉवर प्ले
 Purv Apurv पूर्व अपूर्व
 Sa. Na. Vi. Vi. स. न. वि. वि. /खुला खलिता
 Sanvaad Legendsshi
 Sanvad Legendsshi संवाद लिजंड्सशी
 Sarvottam सर्वोत्तम
 Stump vision स्टंप व्हिजन/क्रिकेट गाथा
 Tanapihinipaja तानापिहिनिपाजा
 Teerkitdha तिरकीटधा
 Third Umpire थर्ड अंपायर
 Tirkatya तिरकटधा
 Valli ani valli वल्ली आणि वल्ली
 Khullamkhilli खुल्लमखिल्ली

Awards
 Late Vishwanath Vable Award for Sportswriting
 Vruthepatra Lekhan Sangha Award
 Maharashtra State Award for Literature
 Sahitya Sabgh Outstanding Writer Award
 Vidyadhar Gokhale Award

References

Living people
Writers from Mumbai
Year of birth missing (living people)